Melecta is a genus of digger-cuckoo bees in the family Apidae. There are at least 50 described species in Melecta.

Species
These 55 species belong to the genus Melecta:

 Melecta aegyptiaca Radoszkowski, 1876 i c g
 Melecta albifrons (Forster, 1771) i c g
 Melecta alcestis Lieftinck, 1980 i c g
 Melecta alexanderi Griswold & Parker, 1999 i c g
 Melecta amanda Lieftinck, 1980 i c g
 Melecta angustilabris Lieftinck, 1980 i c g
 Melecta assimilis Radoszkowski, 1876 i c g
 Melecta atripes Morawitz, 1895 i c g
 Melecta atroalba (Lieftinck, 1972) i c g
 Melecta baeri Radoszkowski, 1865 i c g
 Melecta bohartorum Linsley, 1939 i c g
 Melecta brevipila Lieftinck, 1980 i c g
 Melecta canariensis Lieftinck, 1958 i c g
 Melecta candiae Strand, 1915 g
 Melecta candida Lieftinck, 1980 i c g
 Melecta caroli Lieftinck, 1958 i c g
 Melecta chalybeia (Lieftinck, 1972) i c g
 Melecta chinensis Cockerell, 1931 i c g
 Melecta corpulenta Morawitz, 1875 i c g
 Melecta curvispina Lieftinck, 1958 i c g
 Melecta diacantha Eversmann, 1852 i c g
 Melecta diligens Lieftinck, 1983 i c g
 Melecta duodecimmaculata (Rossi, 1790) i c g
 Melecta edwardsii Cresson, 1878 i c g b (Edward's melecta)
 Melecta emodi Baker, 1997 i c g
 Melecta excelsa Lieftinck, 1980 i c g
 Melecta festiva Lieftinck, 1980 i c g
 Melecta fulgida Lieftinck, 1980 i c g
 Melecta fumipennis Lieftinck, 1980 i c g
 Melecta funeraria Smith, 1854 i c g
 Melecta fuscipennis (Morawitz, 1875) i c g
 Melecta gracilipes Lieftinck, 1980 i c g
 Melecta grandis Lepeletier, 1841 i c g
 Melecta guichardi Lieftinck, 1980 i c g
 Melecta guilochei Dusmet y Alonso, 1915 i c g
 Melecta honesta Lieftinck, 1980 i c g
 Melecta italica Radoszkowski, 1876 i c g
 Melecta kuschakewiczi (Radoszkowski, 1890) i c g
 Melecta leucorhyncha Gribodo, 1893 i c g
 Melecta luctuosa (Scopoli, 1770) i c g
 Melecta mundula Lieftinck, 1983 i c g
 Melecta nivosa Morawitz, 1893 i c g
 Melecta obscura Friese, 1895 i c g
 Melecta octomaculata Radoszkowski, 1876 g
 Melecta pacifica Cresson, 1878 i c g b
 Melecta prophanta Lieftinck, 1980 i c g
 Melecta rutenica Radoszkowski, 1893 g
 Melecta separata Cresson, 1879 i c g b
 Melecta sibirica Radoszkowski, 1891 i c g
 Melecta sinaitica (Alfken, 1937) i c g
 Melecta solivaga Lieftinck, 1980 i c g
 Melecta thoracica Cresson, 1875 i c g
 Melecta transcaspica Morawitz, 1895 i c g
 Melecta tuberculata Lieftinck, 1980 i c g
 Melecta turkestanica Radoszkowski, 1893 i c g

Data sources: i = ITIS, c = Catalogue of Life, g = GBIF, b = Bugguide.net

References

Further reading

External links

 

Apinae
Articles created by Qbugbot